Operation Royal Flush was a military deception employed by the Allied Nations during the Second World War as part of the strategic deception Operation Bodyguard. Royal Flush was a political deception which expanded on the efforts of another Bodyguard deception, Operation Graffham, by emphasising the threat to Norway. It also lent support to parts of Operation Zeppelin via subtle diplomatic overtures to Spain and Turkey. The idea was that information from these neutral countries would filter back to the Abwehr (German Intelligence). Planned in April 1944 by Ronald Wingate, Royal Flush was executed throughout June by various Allied ambassadors to the neutral states. During implementation the plan was revised several times to be less extreme in its diplomatic demands. Information from neutral embassies was not well trusted by the Abwehr; as a result, Royal Flush had limited impact on German plans through 1944.

Background

Operation Royal Flush formed part of Operation Bodyguard, a broad strategic military deception intended to confuse the Axis high command as to Allied intentions during the lead-up to the Normandy landings. Royal Flush developed a series of political misdirections in mid-1944 to support other deceptions between June and July. It evolved from Operation Graffham, a political deception aimed at Sweden between February and March 1944.

Graffham was suggested and planned by the London Controlling Section (LCS) with the aim of convincing the Swedish government that the Allies intended to invade Norway, in support of Operation Fortitude North. During the war Sweden maintained a neutral position, and had relations with both Axis and the Allied nations. It was therefore assumed that if Sweden believed in an imminent threat to Norway this would be passed on to German intelligence. Graffham was envisioned as an extension of existing pressure the Allies were placing on Sweden to end their neutral stance. By increasing this pressure the head of the LCS, Colonel John Bevan, hoped to further convince the Germans that Sweden was preparing to join the Allied nations.

Royal Flush was also intended to support Operation Zeppelin, the 1944 overall deception plan for the Middle Eastern theatre. Zeppelin developed threats against Greece and Southern France between February and July. Its intention was to tie up German defensive forces in the region during the period of D-Day.

Operation
Royal Flush was planned in April 1944 by Ronald Wingate, deputy controller of the LCS. His theory was based on the idea that the Allied nations might rely on forms of help from neutral countries following any invasions. Having seen the implementation of Operation Graffham, and with the deceptions aimed at Scandinavia and the Mediterranean, he chose Sweden, Turkey and Spain as the targets. For Sweden this was the continuation of Graffham, with demands from the US, UK and Russia that the Germans be denied access to the country following an Allied invasion of Norway. In the case of Turkey this was built on existing pressure, applied from the outset of the war, to join the Allied nations.

In Turkey the plan called for diplomatic pressure on 8 June 1944, following the Normandy Landings, to allow the Allied forces access to Turkey for the purposes of staging an invasion of Greece (in support of the story of Zeppelin). At the same time the Soviets would make a similar request of Bulgaria. However, it was agreed that this risked a pre-emptive invasion of Turkey by German forces. Instead, the Allies took advantage of German warships being permitted, in June, access to Turkish territorial waters to transit to the Aegean Sea. A complaint to the Turkish government emphasised the Allies' interest in the Balkans and that they did not wish to see the Germans reinforcing the region.

On 3 June, Spain was approached by the US ambassador with a request to use Spanish ports for evacuating the wounded, following landings in southern France. Originally the plan had been to request access for the purposes of staging the initial invasion. However, this was toned down in light of historical resistance to any foreign occupation of Spanish soil as well as the implausibility of invading France via the Pyrenees. On 5 June the British ambassador reinforced the request, and after some discussion the Spanish government agreed but only after an invasion had occurred, and under the supervision of the Red Cross. To emphasise the change in objective, the Allies followed this up with Operation Ferdinand which threatened an invasion in Italy.

Impact

Information from neutral countries, such as those targeted by Royal Flush, had limited impact on German plans. In July 1944 a report by the Abwehr identified these countries as "outspoken deception centres". To make matters worse for the Allies, these political deceptions were not as tightly controlled as the double agents, and so as an overall information channel they could be confusing and disjointed.

The complaint to Turkey had a desired effect locally, with an apology from the country's government and a commitment to breaking diplomatic ties to Germany if required. However, it failed to elicit a response from Germany. The Allies' request to the Spanish government was relayed to the Germans, but identified almost immediately as deception and misdirection.

References

Bibliography
 
 
 
 
 
 

Royal Flush
Royal Flush